The 2006 Individual Long Track/Grasstrack World Championship was the 36th edition of the FIM speedway Individual Long Track World Championship.

The world title was won by Robert Barth of Germany for the fourth time.

Venues

Final Classification

References 

2006
Speedway competitions in France
Speedway competitions in Germany
Long